David Antony Fromanteel Lytton-Cobbold, 2nd Baron Cobbold,  (14 July 1937 – 9 May 2022) was a British hereditary peer and member of the House of Lords.

Early life

He was born David Antony Fromanteel Cobbold, the elder son of Cameron Fromanteel "Kim" Cobbold (who would be created 1st Baron Cobbold in 1960) and Lady Hermione Bulwer-Lytton. He changed his surname to "Lytton-Cobbold" by deed poll on 10 January 1961. He was a member of the Lytton family (Earls of Lytton) through his mother. In keeping with family tradition, Cobbold was educated at Eton and read Moral Sciences at Trinity College, Cambridge.

Banking career
David Lytton-Cobbold was an executive in the International Banking Department of Bank of London and South America (BOLSA) in the late 1960s, under Edward Clifton-Brown. BOLSA was one of the first banks in the Eurodollar market, developed by Sir George Bolton, Chairman of BOLSA. He was increasingly drawn into the management of Knebworth House, for public events, so he left banking and dedicated himself to the house and estate.

House of Lords

Lytton-Cobbold inherited the Cobbold barony upon his father's death on 1 November 1987. He was appointed a Deputy Lieutenant (DL) by the Lord Lieutenant of Hertfordshire on 8 June 1993. He was one of the ninety hereditary peers elected to remain in the House of Lords after the passing of the House of Lords Act 1999. A runner-up in the initial election that year, he replaced Myrtle Robertson, 11th Baroness Wharton following her death on 15 October 2000.

On 13 October 2014, he became the second person to resign his membership of the House under the House of Lords Reform Act 2014, and the first elected hereditary peer to do so.

Marriage and children
On 7 January 1961, he married Christine Elizabeth Stucley, one of the last generation of debutantes to be presented to the Queen in 1958.  They had four children:

 Henry Fromanteel Lytton-Cobbold, 3rd Baron Cobbold (born 12 May 1962)
 Hon. Peter Guy Fromanteel Lytton-Cobbold (born 25 November 1964)
 Hon. Richard Stucley Fromanteel Lytton-Cobbold (born 31 July 1968)
 Hon. Rosina Kim Lytton-Cobbold (born 14 December 1971)

Lord Cobbold died on 9 May 2022, aged 84, and was succeeded in the barony by his eldest son, Henry.

References

1937 births
2022 deaths
Alumni of Trinity College, Cambridge
2
David
People educated at Eton College
Crossbench hereditary peers
People from Knebworth
Deputy Lieutenants of Hertfordshire

Cobbold
Cobbold